is a former Japanese football player.

Club statistics
Updated to 23 February 2014.

References

External links

1986 births
Living people
Association football people from Hiroshima Prefecture
Japanese footballers
J1 League players
J2 League players
Sanfrecce Hiroshima players
Fagiano Okayama players
Association football midfielders